Anedhella is a genus of moths of the family Noctuidae. The genus was described by Viette in 1965.

Species
Anedhella boisduvali Viette, 1965 Madagascar
Anedhella interrupta (Janse, 1938) South Africa, Tanzania
Anedhella nigrivittata (Hampson, 1902) Zaire, Zimbabwe, Zambia, South Africa
Anedhella rectiradiata (Hampson, 1902) Botswana, Namibia, Zimbabwe, Tanzania, South Africa
Anedhella stigmata (Janse, 1938) Zimbabwe, Zaire, Tanzania
Anedhella thermodesa (Viette, 1958) Madagascar

References

Acronictinae
Noctuoidea genera